"Play Your Part" is a song by Canadian singer Deborah Cox. It was written and produced by frequent collaborator Shep Crawford for her third studio album The Morning After (2002). Released as the album's third single, it became her eighth number one hit on Billboard's US Dance Club Songs chart.

Track listings

Charts

References

2002 songs
2003 singles
Deborah Cox songs
Songs written by Shep Crawford